Dubiaranea elegans is a species of spiders in the family Linyphiidae. It is found in Chile.

References 

Linyphiidae
Spiders described in 1985
Spiders of South America
Endemic fauna of Chile